Justin Booth "Count Justice" Johnson is from Los Angeles, California.  He is a songwriter, producer and engineer who has most notably produced songs for Chris Brown ("New Flame"), Alesha Dixon ("Top Of The World"),  Sevyn Streeter ("Shoulda Been There"), Nappy Roots ("Small Town")  and Lil Mama ("Stand Up").

Selected Discography

References

Living people
African-American record producers
Record producers from California
Writers from Los Angeles
Businesspeople from Los Angeles
Songwriters from California
Year of birth missing (living people)
Place of birth missing (living people)
21st-century African-American people